Michel Martin Drolling (7 March 1786 – 9 January 1851) was a neoclassic French painter, painter of history and portraitist.

Biography
He was born in Paris. There, he began painting under the supervision of his father, the painter Martin Drolling. After 1806, he studied with Jacques-Louis David. He won the Prix de Rome in 1810 for The Wrath of Achilles. After having worked at the French Academy in Rome, he became known for the Death of Abel, exhibited at the  Salon of 1817.

Consequently, he received many orders and produced, notably, The Lord Descends to Earth to Establish his Empire and Spread his Good Deeds for the ceiling of the room of Illustrious Men at the Louvre, The States-General of Tours in 1836 and The Convention of Alexandria in 1837, both for the museum of history in the Palace of Versailles and Jesus Among the Doctors for the Church of Our-Lady-of-Loretto in Paris in 1840. He was elected a member of the Académie des Beaux-Arts in 1837 and was later named a Professor at the École Nationale Supérieure des Beaux-Arts.

His paintings of history follow the spirit of the time: theatricality combined with bright colours, contrast of lights and precision of detail. He died in Paris.

His most important pupils include Paul Baudry, Jules Breton, Theodor Aman, Roger Fenton, Alfred de Curzon, Charles Joshua Chaplin, Pierre-Victor Galland, Jean-Jacques Henner, Cornelius Krieghoff, Armand Laroche, Charles Nègre, John Charles Robinson, Jules-Émile Saintin, Théophile Schuler and William Strutt.

Gallery

References

External links

1786 births
1851 deaths
Burials at Montparnasse Cemetery
Artists from Paris
19th-century French painters
French male painters
Prix de Rome for painting
École des Beaux-Arts alumni
Members of the Académie des beaux-arts
Pupils of Jacques-Louis David